Thomas White (born 30 April 1984) is an English, Brighton-based musician. Along with their brother, Alex, they form the nucleus of psych-pop band The Electric Soft Parade. 

They have released four albums and a six-track EP. They also contributes vocals and guitar to cult Brighton super-group Brakes, and drums and bass to Restlesslist and Clowns. Besides performing solo and in their own groups, White regularly appears as a session player for, among others, Patrick Wolf, British Sea Power, Levellers and Sparks.

Early life 
Educated at Davigdor Infants, Somerhill Juniors and Hove Park schools, they signed their first record deal (with DB Records) whilst still 16 and studying for their GCSEs.

Career
June 2008 saw the release of their debut solo album, I Dream of Black. Recorded entirely on cassette four-track, the album was considered extremely lo-fi by both fans and critics alike.

A follow-up, 'The Maximalist' (Cooking Vinyl) arrived in March 2010. Whilst still played, recorded and mixed by White themself, the album features a markedly more complex, hi-fi sound, and a sleeve designed by the American artist, Keith Boadwee. The album was released to generally positive reviews, with Uncut magazine awarding four stars, stating, "The Maximalist opens the dam of ostensibly conflicting styles and releases the deluge in all its crazily self-confident, so-wrong-it's-right glory. White fuses elements of The Who, Chicago, My Bloody Valentine, Queens Of The Stone Age, Badalamenti and Badfinger, which is not just a feat of cut-and-paste engineering, but also proof of his verve, vivid imagination and fervent love of music."

On 26 March 2011, White streamed their third solo album for free via YouTube. Entitled 'Yalla!" (Egyptian Arabic for 'let's go') the album was written and recorded over two weeks in the small town of Dahab, South Sinai. Featuring only acoustic guitar and vocal, the album details the limbo at the end of a long relationship compared to that of moving to a foreign country, making myriad references to the sea, shorelines, water, the sun, colours, the weather, travel and nature. All accompanying videos feature footage taken in Brighton, Dahab and Cairo. "Yalla!" was released physically in the UK and digitally worldwide by Bleeding Heart Recordings in March 2012.

Selected discography (1997–2010)

Albums 
Fixed Ascent
 I Am Lost Self-released Cassette EP, 1997 (Guitarist)
 I Am Lost Self-released CD Album, 1997 (Singer/Guitarist)

The Feltro Media
 Metronome's End Self-released CD Album, 1998 (Drummer)
 Go On, Phone in Sick Self-released CD Album, 1999 (Singer/Drummer)
 Neon of the City Self-released CD EP, 1999 (Singer/Drummer)
 The Wonderful World of the Feltro Media Skye Records, 2000 (Singer/Multi-Instrumentalist)

The Electric Soft Parade
 Holes in the Wall DB Records, 2002 (Singer/Multi-Instrumentalist)
 The American Adventure BMG, 2003 (Singer/Multi-Instrumentalist)
 The Human Body EP Truck Records/Better Looking Records, 2005 (Singer/Multi-Instrumentalist)
 No Need to Be Downhearted Truck Records/Better Looking Records/Five Man Army, 2007 (Singer/Multi-Instrumentalist)
 IDIOTS Helium Records, 2013 (Singer/Multi-Instrumentalist)

Brakes
 Give Blood Rough Trade, 2005 (Guitarist)
 The Beatific Visions Rough Trade, 2006 (Guitarist/Singer)
 Touchdown Fat Cat Records, 2009 (Guitarist/Drummer/Singer)
 Rock Is Dodelijk Fat Cat Records, 2009 (Guitarist/Singer)

Restlesslist
 The Rise And Fall of the Curtain Club Life Is Easy, 2008 (Drummer/Keyboardist)
 Coral Island Girl 2012 (Drummer/Keyboardist)

Thomas White
 I Dream of Black Drift Records, 2008 (Singer/Multi-Instrumentalist)
 The Maximalist Cooking Vinyl, 2010 (Singer/Multi-Instrumentalist)
 Yalla! Bleeding Heart Recordings, 2012 (Singer/Guitarist)
 World on a Wire EP Self-released, 2012 (Singer/Multi-Instrumentalist)
 18/12/08 EP Self-released, 2012 (Singer/Multi-Instrumentalist)

Patrick Wolf
 The Bachelor Bandstocks, 2009 (Guitarist)
 Lupercalia Hideout, 2011 (Guitarist)

Milk And Biscuits
 "Balcony Times" Big Salad Records, 2011 (Engineer/Multi-Instrumentalist)

Singles 
The Electric Soft Parade
 Silent to the Dark/Something's Got To Give DB Records, 2001 (Singer/Multi-Instrumentalist)
 Empty at the End DB Records, 2001 (Singer/Multi-Instrumentalist)
 There's A Silence DB Records, 2001 (Multi-Instrumentalist)
 Silent to the Dark II DB Records, 2002 (Singer/Multi-Instrumentalist)
 Empty at the End DB Records, 2002 (Singer/Multi-Instrumentalist)
 Same Way, Every Day DB Records, 2002 (Singer/Multi-Instrumentalist)
 Things I've Done Before BMG, 2003 (Singer/Multi-Instrumentalist)
 Lose Yr Frown BMG, 2003 (Singer/Multi-Instrumentalist)
 Life in the Back-Seat Truck Records, 2006 (Producer/Singer/Multi-Instrumentalist)
 If That's The Case, Then I Don't Know Truck Records, 2007 (Producer/Singer/Multi-Instrumentalist)
 Misunderstanding Truck Records, 2007 (Producer/Singer/Multi-Instrumentalist)
 Appropriate Ending EP Truck Records, 2007 (Producer/Singer/Multi-Instrumentalist)
 A Quick One EP A Quick One Records, 2011 (Producer/Singer/Multi-Instrumentalist)

Brakes
 Pick Up the Phone Rough Trade, 2004 (Guitarist)
 All Night Disco Party Rough Trade, 2005 (Guitarist)
 Ring a Ding Ding Rough Trade, 2005 (Guitarist)
 All Night Disco Party Rough Trade, 2006 (Guitarist
 Hold Me in the River Rough Trade, 2006 (Guitarist)
 Cease and Desist Rough Trade, 2007 (Guitarist)
 Beatific Visions Rough Trade, 2007 (Guitarist)
 Hey Hey Fat Cat Records, 2009 (Guitarist)
 Don't Take Me To Space (Man) Fat Cat Records, 2009 (Guitarist)
 Why Tell The Truth (When It's Easier To Lie) Fat Cat Records, 2009 (Guitarist)

Restlesslist
 Butlin Breaks/The Cowboy Song Life Is Easy, 2007 (Drummer)

Thomas White
 The Runaround Drift Records, 2008 (Producer/Singer/Multi-Instrumentalist)
 The Last Blast EP Cooking Vinyl, 2010 (Producer/Singer/Multi-Instrumentalist)
 Accidentally Like A Martyr EP Cooking Vinyl, 2010 (Producer/Singer/Multi-Instrumentalist)

Patrick Wolf
 Hard Times Bandstocks, 2009 (Guitarist)

References 

English rock musicians
Living people
1984 births
Musicians from Brighton and Hove
The Electric Soft Parade members
Brakes (band) members